The Jerwood Fiction Uncovered Prize is a literary award for eight British writers of outstanding works of fiction, who each receive £5,000.

History
Fiction Uncovered was established in 2011 by The Literary Platform with funding from Arts Council England, and became the Jerwood Fiction Uncovered Prize with sponsorship from the Jerwood Foundation from 2014.

Past winners

2011

2012

2013

2014

2015

References

External links

Matt Haig, "What the Jerwood Fiction Uncovered prize reveals", The Guardian, 20 June 2014

Awards established in 2011
2011 establishments in the United Kingdom
British fiction awards